Cyperus alulatus is a species of sedge that is native to eastern parts of Asia.

See also 
 List of Cyperus species

References 

alulatus
Plants described in 1952
Flora of India (region)
Flora of Nepal
Flora of Afghanistan
Flora of Oman
Flora of Pakistan
Taxa named by Johannes Hendrikus Kern